Renzo Montagnani (September 11, 1930 – May 22, 1997) was an Italian actor and voice actor.

Biography

Montagnani was born in Alessandria, Piedmont, and debuted as theatre actor thanks to the help of Erminio Macario. His first cinema success was his dramatic role in Metello (1970), but he later switched to the commedia all'italiana with his roles in the last two chapters of the Amici miei series (1982 and 1985). In the 1980s he also participated to a TV show as Don Fumino, an easy-speaking Tuscan parish priest.

Montagnani also intensively worked as dubber, dubbing actors such as Michel Piccoli, Charles Bronson and Philippe Noiret for the Italian version of movies. He was also the Italian voice of Thomas O'Malley in the 1970 Disney film The Aristocats.

In his later years he participated to numerous commedia sexy all'italiana films, often pairing with Edwige Fenech, the most popular actress of the genre, and also with Alvaro Vitali as the comic sidekick.

Personal life
In 1959, Montagnani married Eileen Jarvis, who was a member of the Bluebell Girls. In 1963, they had one son, Daniele.

Death
Montagnani died in Rome of lung cancer on 22 May 1997 at the age of 66. He was buried in England. His son Daniele, died of cancer in 2004 and was buried alongside his father.

Filmography 

 Dreams Die at Dawn (1961) as Sergio
 Dal sabato al lunedi (1962) as custom man
 Honeymoon, Italian Style (1966) as Nicola
 I sette fratelli Cervi (1968) as Ferdinando Cervi
 Donne, botte e bersaglieri (1968) as Luigi
 Faustina (1968) as Quirino
 La matriarca (1969) as Fabrizio
 Metello (1970) as Poldo Salani (uncredited)
 Quando le donne avevano la coda (1970) as Maluc 
 Tre ipotesi sulla morte di Pinelli (1970, Short)
 Mazzabubù... Quante corna stanno quaggiù? (1971) as Bepi, the farmer
 Una cavalla tutta nuda (1972) as Gulfardo de Bardi
 Il sindacalista (1972) as Luigi Tamperletti
 Jus primae noctis (1972) as Gandolfo
 L'arma, l'ora, il movente (1972) as commissioner Franco Boito
 Il prode Anselmo e il suo scudiero (1972) as Ottone
 Fiorina la vacca (1972) as Compare Menico
 Number One (1973) as Vinci
 The Assassination of Matteotti (1973) as Umberto Tancredi
 Massacre in Rome (1973) as police chief Pietro Caruso
 Le folli avventure di Rabbi Jacob (1973) as colonel Farès
 La preda (1974) as Daniel Lester
 Peccati in famiglia (1975, regia di Bruno Gaburro) as Carlo
 Il vizio di famiglia (1975) as Giacomo
 La nuora giovane (1975) as Accountant
 Lezioni private (1975) as Giulio - uncle of Alessandro
 La moglie vergine (1975) as Uncle Federico Arrighini
 Amici miei (1975) as Giorgio Perozzi (voice, uncredited)
 Quel movimento che mi piace tanto (1976) as Il 'marquis' Cecco Ottobuoni
 Il letto in piazza (1976) as Luca Reali
 La segretaria privata di mio padre (1976) as Armando Ponziani
 Donna... cosa si fa per te (1976) as Francesco 'Cecco' Balducci
 Cassiodoro il più duro del pretorio (1976)
 Il ginecologo della mutua (1977) as Dr. Franco Giovanardi
 Peccatori di provincia (1977) as Angelo Lo Curcio / Sindaco-Mayor
 L'appuntamento (1977) as Adelmo Bartalesi
 La soldatessa alla visita militare (1977) as colonel Narciso Fiaschetta
 When the Silver Crows Fly (1977) as Maineddu
 L'insegnante va in collegio (1978) as Riccardo Bolzoni
 Una bella governante di colore (1978) as Nicola Sallusti
 L'insegnante viene a casa (1978) as Ferdinando Bonci Marinotti
 La soldatessa alle grandi manovre (1978) as colonel Fiaschetta
 Viaggio con Anita (1979) as Omero
 L'insegnante balla... con tutta la classe (1979) as Prof. Martorelli
 Dove vai se il vizietto non ce l'hai? (1979) as Diogene Colombo
 La vedova del trullo (1979) as Nicola /Prof. Luigi Granini
 Scusi, lei è normale? (1979) as Gustavo Sparvieri
 Io zombo, tu zombi, lei zomba (1979) as undertaker
 Riavanti... Marsch! (1979) as Lieutenant Pietro Bianchi
 La giacca verde (1979, TV Movie) as Romualdi
 Il corpo della ragassa (1979) as Pasquale Aguzzi
 Qua la mano (1980) as Libero Battaglini
 La moglie in vacanza... l'amante in città (1980) as Andrea Damiani
 Prestami tua moglie (1980) as Mario Bonotto
 La liceale al mare con l'amica di papà (1980) as Massimo Castaldi
 Una moglie, due amici, quattro amanti (1980) as Luigi Frontoni
 Il casinista (1980) as Enrico Marcullo
 Tutta da scoprire (1981) as Arturo Bonafé
 C'è un fantasma nel mio letto (1981) as Baron Sir Archibald Trenton
 I carabbinieri (1981) as General Nencini
 Per favore, occupati di Amelia (1981) as Marcello
 Mia moglie torna a scuola (1981) as Aristide Buratti
 Perché non facciamo l'amore? (1981) as Dr. Bernardino Livi
 La poliziotta a New York (1981) as Maccarone
 La dottoressa preferisce i marinai (1981) as suicide
 L'assistente sociale tutto pepe (1981) as 'Gratta'
 Il marito in vacanza (1981) as Prof. Esposito / Cardinal Peppino
 I carabbimatti (1981) as Dallas (uncredited)
 Crema, cioccolata e pa... prika (1981) as Osvaldo Bonifazi
 Pierino la Peste alla riscossa (1982) as Pier Maria Delle Vedove
 Il regalo (1982) as L'émir Fayçal de Krator
 Amici miei atto II (1982) as Guido Necchi
 Giocare d'azzardo (1982) as Riccardo
 State buoni se potete (1983) as The Devil (Il diavolo)
 Scherzo del destino in agguato dietro l'angolo come un brigante da strada (1983) as captain Pautasso of the DIGOS
 Occhio, malocchio, prezzemolo e finocchio (1983) as Aldovrandi
 Stesso mare stessa spiaggia (1983) as Il Trivella
 Champagne in Paradiso (1983) as Don Giovanni
 Amici miei atto III (1985) as Guido Necchi
 Quelli del casco (1988)
 Il volpone (1988) as Raffaele Voltore
 Rimini Rimini - Un anno dopo (1988) as Luciano Ambrosi ("La scelta")
 Zuppa di pesce (1992)

References

External links

1930 births
1997 deaths
People from Alessandria
Italian male film actors
Italian male voice actors
Italian male stage actors
Italian male television actors
20th-century Italian male actors
University of Florence alumni
Deaths from lung cancer in Lazio
People of Tuscan descent